Ernakulam State assembly constituency is one of the 140 state legislative assembly constituencies in Kerala state in southern India. It is also one of the 7 state legislative assembly constituencies included in the Ernakulam Lok Sabha constituency.
 As of the 2021 assembly elections, the current MLA is T. J. Vinod of INC.

Local self governed segments
Ernakulam Niyama Sabha constituency is composed of the following 24 wards of the Kochi Municipal Corporation (Ernakulam zone and Vaduthala zone), and 1 Gram Panchayat in Kanayannur Taluk:

Wards 29 and 30 are included in Kochi Taluk, while the remaining 22 wards in the constituency are parts of Kanayannur Taluk.

Members of Legislative Assembly
The following list contains all members of Kerala legislative assembly who have represented Ernakulam Niyamasabha Constituency during the period of various assemblies:

Key

 

 * Byepoll

Election results
Percentage change (±%) denotes the change in the number of votes from the immediate previous election.

Niyamasabha Election 2021 
There were 1,64,534 registered voters in Eranakulam Constituency for the 2021 Kerala Niyama Sabha Election.

Niyama Sabha By-election 2019
Due to the election of the sitting MLA Hibi Eden as the MP from Ernakulam (Lok Sabha constituency), Ernakulam Niyamasabha Constituency went to by-polls on 21 October 2019. There were 1,55,306 registered voters in Ernakulam Constituency for this election.  T. J. Vinod won the resulting by-election by 3750 votes.

Niyamasabha Election 2016
There were 1,54,092 registered voters in Ernakulam Constituency for the 2016 Kerala Niyamasabha Election.

Niyamasabha Election 2011 
There were 1,36,722 registered voters in the constituency for the 2011 election.

See also
 Ernakulam
 Ernakulam district
 List of constituencies of the Kerala Legislative Assembly
 2016 Kerala Legislative Assembly election
 2019 Kerala Legislative Assembly by-elections

References 

Assembly constituencies of Kerala

State assembly constituencies in Ernakulam district